Pongummart Ummarttayakul (born 14 April 1934) is a Thai police general. He served as deputy commissioner-general of the Royal Thai Police and briefly as acting commissioner-general prior to his retirement in 1994. In his youth, he competed as a sprinter in the men's 400 metres at the 1952 Summer Olympics.

References

1934 births
Living people
Pongummart Ummarttayakul
Athletes (track and field) at the 1952 Summer Olympics
Pongummart Ummarttayakul
Pongummart Ummarttayakul
Place of birth missing (living people)
Pongummart Ummarttayakul